The 2005 Copa del Rey was the 69th edition of the Spanish basketball Cup. It was organized by the ACB and was disputed in Zaragoza in the Pabellón Príncipe Felipe between days 17 and 20 of February. The winning team was Unicaja.

Brackett

Quarterfinals

Semifinals

Final

MVP of the Tournament: Jorge Garbajosa

See also
Liga ACB
Copa del Rey de Baloncesto

External links
Official website

Copa del Rey de Baloncesto
2004–05 in Spanish basketball